Stony Furlong Railway Cutting is a  geological Site of Special Scientific Interest in Gloucestershire, notified in 1987. The site is listed in the 'Cotswold District' Local Plan 2001-2011 (on line) as a Key Wildlife Site (KWS) and a Regionally Important Geological Site (RIGS).

Location and geology
The site is located in east Gloucestershire, near Chedworth, and is significant as it shows an important section through the White Limestone (Bathonian, Middle Jurassic period).  It is unique in the area for exhibition of the Shipton Member.  The exposure demonstrates the south west passage of the Hampen Marly Beds.  This links with similar exposures in Wiltshire, Oxfordshire and eastern Gloucestershire.

The site has produced significant findings of ammonites and a rarity of the morruisi Zone.

The site is a significant research resource.

References

SSSI Source
 Natural England SSSI information on the citation
 Natural England SSSI information on the Stony Furlong Railway Cutting units

External links
 Natural England (SSSI information)

Sites of Special Scientific Interest in Gloucestershire
Sites of Special Scientific Interest notified in 1987